Larry Moriarty (born April 24, 1958) is a former professional American football player who played running back for six seasons for the Houston Oilers and Kansas City Chiefs he was drafted by the Houston Oilers in the 5th round (114th overall) of the 1983 NFL Draft. He attended Notre Dame in Indiana.

References

1958 births
Living people
Sportspeople from Santa Barbara, California
American football running backs
Houston Oilers players
Kansas City Chiefs players
Notre Dame Fighting Irish football players